The Leptospiraceae are a family of spirochete bacteria. It includes the genus Leptospira which contains some pathogenic species.

Systematic 
These genera belong to the family Leptospiraceae:

 Leptonema (with species Leptonema illini)
 Leptospira
 Turneriella

References

Spirochaetes